According to the northern cryptic glacial refugial hypothesis (or glacial survival hypothesis), during the last ice age cold tolerant plant and animal species (e.g. Norway spruce and Norwegian lemmings) persisted in ice-free microrefugia north of the Alps in Europe. The alternative hypothesis of no persistence and postglacial immigration of plants and animals from southern refugia in Europe (southern refugia paradigm) is sometimes also called the tabula rasa hypothesis.

Over the past plants and animals have persisted through long periods of climate change including several glacial and interglacial periods. There is a long-standing debate on what happened to the species that were inhabiting high-latitude regions during the Pleistocene ice age. Two main scenarios are usually considered. The first scenario proposes a total extinction of species within glaciated areas with survival events in peripheral refugia in the south and successive massive postglacial migration into empty areas (tabula rasa hypothesis). The second scenario proposes long-term in situ survival within glaciated regions (glacial survival hypothesis), either in isolated northern ice-free micro-refugia at the edge of the ice sheet, or on exposed mountains not covered with ice within the ice sheet (nunatak hypothesis).

For boreal and cold-tolerant species the glacial survival hypothesis is credible, though controversial, and a growing body of Molecular biology data support it for both plant and animal species. A number of recent studies indicate that several northern regions (above latitudes >45° N) supported low-density boreal and temperate tree populations during the late-glacial or Early Holocene [e.g. North America,  Eurasia, Alps, Scandinavia].

In recent years several studies have combined lines of evidence coming from three major disciplines to infer the existence of past refugia: fossil records, species distribution models and molecular/phylogeographic surveys. In this way, it should be possible to better describe complex migration routes followed by species and populations in and out of refugia through time and space. 

There has also been research to suggest that certain cold-tolerant tree species were able to survive the low temperatures thanks to the presence of a co-dependent beetle by the name of G. intermedia.

See also 
Last Glacial Maximum refugia
Refugium (population biology)
Glacial refugium

References 

Hypotheses
Climate change
Glaciers
Ice ages